During the 2000–01 English football season, Millwall F.C. competed in the Football League Second Division.

Season summary
In the 2000–01 season, Millwall controversially sacked joint managers Keith Stevens and Alan McLeary in September, stating that the club didn't believe Stevens and McLeary could meet Millwall's target goal. Ray Harford was appointed caretaker manager on a temporary basis and it seemed possible that he might be given the job permanently, but Mark McGhee was named as their replacement and eight months later the club won promotion as Division Two champions after five years in the lower tier of the league.

Final league table

Results
Millwall's score comes first

Legend

FA Cup

League Cup

Football League Trophy

Players

First-team squad
Squad at end of season

Left club during season

Notes

References

Millwall F.C. seasons
Millwall